Thatha Shamsa Chattha (Urdu (ٹھٹھہ شمسہ چٹھہ) is a small village in Hafizabad District of Punjab, Pakistan. It is named after Jatt Chattha Tribe forefather Shamsa Chattha, Thatha Shamsa means the town of Shamsa. The descendants of Shamsa, (Mishri, Mauladad, and Noor Mahi), own the land in the adjoining areas and are called "Zamindars" and most of them still to date rely on fulfilling the life needs from farming. This village is located at 32° 15' 50N,73° 41' 40E with an altitude of 206 meters (679  feet). It is the oldest village which is believed to be pre-dated prior to the Mughal era. 

The village consists of approximately 200-250 homes and a total population of approximately 2500 odds as of 2023. It is situated on the bank of a canal which originates from the Barrage Qadirabad Colony. Most of the land suffers from seepage, higher water bed, which makes it unsuitable for conventional crops and cultivation. This is the main reason that many residents have been driven away from villages to either big cities/overseas for better opportunities or converted their lands into Fish Farms. Presently, the village is surrounded on all sides by fish farms, metaphorically an artificial island. 

Thatha Shamsa is bounded by rivers and canals. The major canal originates from Chenab River at Barrage Qadirabad Colony in the west of the village. River Chenab is a few miles away from the village, and during Monsoon weather, the village often faces a threat of flooding. The weather is usually intemperate in summer and winter but autumn and spring are mild. The weather is usually dry and humid during  Monsoons, summer also creates a good level of humidity as surrounded by fish farms. Sometimes there are prolonged rain spells during the winter, which in the local language is called "Jarri", winter depression. The village looks very beautiful at the beginning of the spring weather, but this fascinating beauty only long over a few weeks.

Geography and Climate
Thatha Shamsa (Chattha) is bounded approximately by a river and canals. The canal, which runs parallel to Thatha Shamasa comes from Barrage Qadirabad Colony and is west of Thatha Shamsa. The land is plain and good for agriculture and Fish Farming with plenty of water supply. Farmers have drilled many tube wells, to pump out the water, due to the undependable climate.

Transport
There are no scheduled modes of public transport in this village. Most of the time, the people have to travel towards Sooianwala or Kot Hara or Qadirabad Colony to get access to transport that travels to bigger cities of Punjab, Pakistan; i.e.,  Lahore, Islamabad, Gujranwala, Hafizabad, Alipur Chattha, etc. Recently the transport system has been improved considerably, as some special routes towards big cities of Punjab start operating. For casual work, the villagers use motorcycles and bicycles as the most convenient and fast transport system.

Recreational Activities
People of the village have limited choices for their recreational activities. Most of the time, the people go to Qadirabad Colony, Sooianwala and Kot Hara to enjoy restaurant foods and for other miscellaneous activities. The villagers usually play football, cricket, and Kabadi (a type of wrestling). In this regard, the thatha Shamsa's team has won a good number of cricket tournaments which were held in that region. But the lack of good playing grounds, kudos to local thugs and land grabbers, drives them to travel sometimes 2-5 km to have their games.

Educational Institutes
There are two primary schools that are funded and governed by the Government of Punjab. Government Primary School for Boys and Government Primary School for Girls which is under consideration to be upgraded to middle school in the near future. As most of the villagers are poor, so they send their children to these public schools. A few families in this village are richer (overseases money), and they send their children to private English medium schools. Most children, after completing their primary education, move to Sooianwala high schools to complete their secondary education. Ironically, the literacy rate in this village is very low compared to its neighboring villages, i.e., Sooianwala, Madrassa Chattha, kot Hara, Nakki Chatha, Bhiri Chatha, etc.

Prominent Scholars & Personalities
 Dr. M Iqbal Chattha (Ph.D. from Imperial College London, Ex Federal Govt Officer Grade 18, CEO of a High Tech Business)
 Dr. M Usman Chattha (MBBS, Bureaucrat)
 Dr. M Salman Chattha (MBBS, Physician)
 Ch M Aslam Chattha (SDO Provincial GOVT)
 Engr. Adnan Farooq Chattha (BE Mechanical Engineering, UET Lahore)

Statistics Location
32.25°N, 73.70°E
Calling Code: 0547
Union Council: Vanike Tarar
Major Crops: Rice, Wheat, Sugarcane
Major Industries: Farming, Fish farming, Animal breeding,  Milk Processing
Banks: No Bank
Religious Places: 1 Mosque

Telephone Networks
Pakistan Telecommunication Company (PTCL)
Pakistan Telenor HSPA
Paktel GSM
Pakistan Mobilink GSM Pakistan
Pakistan Warid GSM Company

References

 http://uet.edu.pk/
 http://www.citymaphq.com/pakistan/punjab/thatta_shamsa.html
http://wikimapia.org/11013355/Thatha-Shamsa-Chattha
http://sthweb.bu.edu/shaw/anna-howard-shaw-center/biography?view=mediawiki&article=Thatha_shamsa
http://www.aepam.edu.pk/Download/schools%20directory/Punjab(Hafizabad).pdf
http://www.fallingrain.com/world/PK/4/Thatta_Shamsa.html
http://www.ecp.gov.pk/content/punjb/Hafizabad.pdf
http://www.hafizabad.gov.pk District of Hafizabad - Official Site
https://web.archive.org/web/20080705220929/http://www.lgdsindh.com.pk/khairpur2.htm Local Govt. department of Punjab - District of Hafizabad
http://www.britannica.com/EBchecked/topic/109176/Chenab-River - 44k

External references
 District of Hafizabad - Official Site
 Thatha_Shamsa Heritage & Welfare NGO
 Local Govt. department of Punjab - District of Hafizabad

Punjab